This is a list of Estonian television related events from 1996.

Events
 7 May – the final of the music competition "Kaks takti ette". The winner was Tiiu Tulp.

Debuts

Television shows

Ending this year

Births

Deaths

See also
1995 in Estonia

References

1990s in Estonian television